The House of Andechs was a feudal line of German princes in the 12th and 13th centuries. The counts of Dießen-Andechs (1100 to 1180) obtained territories in northern Dalmatia on the Adriatic seacoast, where they became Margraves of Istria and ultimately dukes of a short-lived imperial state named Merania from 1180 to 1248. They were also self-styled lords of Carniola.

History
The noble family originally resided in southwestern Bavaria at the castle of Ambras near Innsbruck, controlling the road to the March of Verona across the Brenner Pass, at Dießen am Ammersee and Wolfratshausen. One Count Rasso (Rath) is documented in Dießen, who allegedly fought against the invading Magyars in the early 10th century and established the monastery of Grafrath. By their ancestor Count Palatine Berthold of Reisensburg, a grandson of the Bavarian duke Arnulf the Bad, the Andechser may be affiliated with the Luitpolding dynasty. Berthold appears a fierce enemy of King Otto I of Germany and was blamed as a traitor at the 955 Battle of Lechfeld against the Hungarians. He probably married a daughter of Duke Frederick I of Upper Lorraine; his descendant Count Berthold II (d. 1151), from about 1100 residing at Andechs, is credited as the progenitor of the comital dynasty.

Berthold II had inherited the family's Bavarian territories but also acquired possessions in the adjacent Franconian region, where about 1135 he had the Plassenburg built near Bayreuth and established the town of Kulmbach. He served as vogt of Benediktbeuern Abbey and by marriage with Sophie, daughter of Margrave Poppo II, came into property of lands in the March of Istria and Carniola.

In the year 1180, the County of Andechs acquired the town of Innsbruck.

Otto II of Andechs was bishop of Bamberg from 1177 to 1196. In 1208, when Philip of Swabia, King of the Germans, was assassinated at Bamberg by Otto VIII of Wittelsbach, members of the House of Andechs were implicated.

Saint Hedwig of Andechs (c. 1174 – October 1243) was one of eight children born to Berthold IV, Duke of Merania, Count of Dießen-Andechs and Margrave of Istria. Of her four brothers, two became bishops: Ekbert of Bamberg (1203–1231), and Berthold, Patriarch of Aquileia.

Otto succeeded his father as Duke of Dalmatia, and Henry became Margrave of Istria. Of her three sisters, Gertrude of Andechs-Merania (1185 – 28 September 1213) was the first wife of Andrew II of Hungary and the mother of St Elizabeth of Hungary; Mechtilde became Abbess of Kitzingen; while Agnes, a famous beauty, was made the illegitimate third wife of Philip II of France in 1196, on the repudiation of his lawful wife, Ingeborg, but was dismissed in 1200, after Pope Innocent III laid France under an interdict.

Genealogy
Arnold IV, Count of Dießen (d. 1098), married to Gisela of Schweinfurt, daughter of Duke Otto III of Swabia
Berthold II (d.1151), Count of Dießen and Andechs in Bavaria, Count of Plassenburg and Kulmbach in Franconia, Vogt of Benediktbeuern Abbey, married Sophia, daughter of Margrave Poppo II of Istria, secondly married to Kunigunde of Vornbach
Poppo (d. Constantinople 11 December 1148), married to Kuniza of Giech, divorced 1142
Henry, Abbot of Millstatt
Margrave Berthold I of Istria (c. 1110/15 – 14 December 1188), married to Hedwig, daughter of Count Otto V of Wittelsbach, secondly to Luitgard, daughter of King Sweyn III of Denmark
Berthold IV, Duke of Merania (d. 12 August 1204), married to Agnes of Wettin, daughter of Margrave Dedi III of Lusatia
Otto I, Duke of Merania (d. 7 May 1234), Count Palatine of Burgundy, Margrave of Istria, married to Beatrice of Hohenstaufen, daughter of Count Otto I of Burgundy, secondly to Sophia of Ascania, daughter of Count Henry I of Anhalt
Otto III, Count of Burgundy (c. 1226 – 19 June 1248), Duke of Merania, married to Elizabeth, daughter of Count Adalbert IV of Tyrol
Agnes (d. 1263), married to the last Babenberg duke Frederick II of Austria (divorced); secondly, to the last Sponheim duke, Ulric III of Carinthia
Beatrix (d. after 1265), married to the Ascanian count Herman II of Weimar-Orlamünde
Margaret (d. 18 October 1271), married to Přemysl of Moravia, son of King Ottokar I of Bohemia; secondly, to Count Frederick of Truhendingen
Adelaide (d. 8 March 1279), married to Count Hugh III of Burgundy, secondly to Count Philip I of Savoy
Elizabeth (d. 18 December 1272), married to the Hohenzollern burgrave Frederick III of Nuremberg
Henry (d. 18 July 1228), Margrave of Istria, married to Sophia of Weichselburg
Ekbert (d. 6 June 1237) Bishop of Bamberg
Berthold (d. 23 May 1251), Archbishop of Kalocsa, Patriarch of Aquileia
Agnes (c. 1180 – 29 July 1201), married to King Philip II of France
Gertrude (assassinated 28 September 1213), married to King Andrew II of Hungary
Saint Hedwig (c. 1176/80 – 14 May 1243, Abbess of Trzebnica, married to Henry I the Bearded, Duke of Silesia
Mathilde (d. 1 December 1254), Abbess of Kitzingen
unnamed daughter, married into the royal Nemanjic family of Serbia
Sophia (d.1218), married to Count Poppo VI of Henneberg
Kunigunde (d.1207), married to Count Eberhard III of Eberstein
Mechtild (d.1245), married to Count Frederick I of Hohenburg, secondly to Count Engelbert III of Görz
Poppo (1175 – Dezember 1245), Bishop of Bamberg
Bertha, Abbess of Gerbstedt
Otto (c. 1132 – 1196), Bishop of Brixen and Bamberg
Mechtildis of Edelstetten (d.1160)
Euphemia (d.1180), Abbess of Altomünster

Kunigunde (d.1139), nun in Admont Abbey

A history of the House of Andechs was written by the statesman and historian Joseph Hormayr, Baron zu Hortenburg, and published in 1796.

Notes

External links

Counts of Germany